Triple Alliance may refer to:

 Aztec Triple Alliance (1428–1521), Tenochtitlan, Texcoco and Tlacopan
 Triple Alliance (1596), England, France, and the Dutch Republic
 Triple Alliance (1668), England, the Dutch Republic and Sweden
 Triple Alliance (1717), Great Britain, the Dutch Republic and France
 Triple Alliance (1788), Great Britain, the Dutch Republic and Prussia
 Treaty of the Triple Alliance (1865), Brazil, Uruguay and Argentina
 Paraguayan War or War of the Triple Alliance (1864–1870)
 Triple Alliance (1882), Germany, Austria-Hungary and Italy
 Triple Alliance (1914) of British trade unions: Miners' Federation of Great Britain, National Transport Workers' Federation and National Union of Railwaymen
 HMT Triple Alliance, a requisitioned trawler of the Royal Navy in World War II

See also 
 Holy Alliance (1815), Russia, Austria and Prussia
 Triple Entente (1907), Britain, France and Russia
 Tripartite Pact of Axis powers (1940), Germany, Italy and Japan
 Dual Alliance (disambiguation)
 Quadruple Alliance (disambiguation)

Military alliances